This article lists the regiments of the Indian Army, including the various corps of supporting arms and services.

History

Historic list of regiments 

The following old lists in this section have been replaced by the present list provided in the subsequent sections:
 List of regiments of the Indian Army (1903)
 List of regiments of the Indian Army (1922)

Regiments

Armoured 

 President's Bodyguard
 1st Horse (Skinner's Horse)
 2nd Lancers (Gardner's Horse)
 3rd Cavalry
 4th Horse (Hodson's Horse)
 5th Armoured Regiment
 6th Lancers
 7th Light Cavalry
 8th Light Cavalry
 9th Horse (The Deccan Horse)
 10 Armoured Regiment
 11 Armoured Regiment
 12 Armoured Regiment
 13 Armoured Regiment
 14 Horse (The Scinde Horse)
 15 Armoured Regiment
 16th Light Cavalry
 17th Horse (The Poona Horse)
 18th Cavalry
 19 Armoured Regiment
 20 Lancers
 21 Horse (Central India Horse)
 41 Armoured Regiment
 42 Armoured Regiment
 43 Armoured Regiment
 44 Armoured Regiment
 45 Cavalry
 46 Armoured Regiment
 47 Armoured Regiment
 48 Armoured Regiment
 49 Armoured Regiment
 50 Armoured Regiment
 51 Armoured Regiment
 52 Armoured Regiment
 53 Armoured Regiment
 54 Armoured Regiment
 55 Armoured Regiment
 56 Armoured Regiment
 57 Armoured Regiment
 58 Armoured Regiment
 59 Armoured Regiment
 60 Armoured Regiment
 61 Cavalry
 62 Cavalry
 63 Cavalry
 64 Cavalry
 65 Armoured Regiment
 66 Armoured Regiment
 67 Armoured Regiment
 68 Armoured Regiment
 69 Armoured Regiment
 70 Armoured Regiment
 71 Armoured Regiment
 72 Armoured Regiment
 73 Armoured Regiment
 74 Armoured Regiment
 75 Armoured Regiment
 76 Armoured Regiment
 81 Armoured Regiment
 82 Armoured Regiment
 83 Armoured Regiment
 84 Armoured Regiment
 85 Armoured Regiment
 86 Armoured Regiment
 87 Armoured Regiment
 88 Armoured Regiment
 89 Armoured Regiment
 90 Armoured Regiment

Artillery

In the Regiment of Artillery the battalion-sized units are referred to as regiments, a point of confusion on occasion. These units are equipped and named based on their type of equipment. There are two types of units. The majority are regiments that have weapons as their equipment, such as missiles, rockets, field guns, medium guns or mortars. The second type of regiment are those that have mission support equipment, such as UAVs, drones, surveillance radars, weapon locating radar etc.

Weapon equipped units

Weapon-equipped units of the Regiment of Artillery are listed below:

 1 Medium Regiment (Meiktila) 
 2 Medium Regiment (Self Propelled) (Letse & Point 171)
 3 Medium Regiment
 4 Medium Regiment (Self Propelled)
 5 Medium Regiment
 6 Field Regiment
 7 Field Regiment (Gazala)
 8 Field Regiment
 9 (Parachute) Field Regiment
 10 Medium Regiment
 11 Medium Regiment (Zojila)
 12 Field Regiment
 13 Medium Regiment (Chushul & Gadra City)
 14 Medium Regiment
 15 Medium Regiment
 16 Medium Regiment
 17 (Parachute) Field Regiment (Zojila & Poongali Bridge)
 18 Medium Regiment
 22 Medium Regiment (Sittang and Yenangyaung)
 23 Field Regiment (Ad Tecleasan and OP Hill)
 24 Field Regiment (Self Propelled)
 31 Field Regiment
 32 Field Regiment
 33 Medium Regiment
 34 Field Regiment (Cassino-II)
 35 Field Regiment
 36 Medium Regiment
 37 (Coorg) Field Regiment
 38 Field Regiment
 39 Field Regiment (Laleali & Piquet 707)
 40 Field Regiment (Asal Uttar)
 41 Medium Regiment (Kargil)
 42 Medium Regiment (Dera Baba Nanak)
 43 Medium Regiment
 44 Field Regiment
 49 Medium Regiment
 51 Medium Regiment
 52 Medium Regiment (Sanjoi-Mirpur)
 53 Field Regiment
 54 Field Regiment
 56 Field Regiment (Jitra)
 57 Field Regiment (Sittang & Yenangyaung)
 58 Medium Regiment
 59 Medium Regiment
 60 Medium Regiment
 61 Medium Regiment
 62 Medium Regiment
 63 Field Regiment
 64 Field Regiment
 65 Field Regiment
 66 Medium Regiment
 67 Field Regiment
 68 Medium Regiment (Parbat Ali)
 69 Medium Regiment
 70 Field Regiment
 71 Field Regiment
 72 Field Regiment
 73 Field Regiment
 74 Medium Regiment
 75 Medium Regiment (Basantar River)
 76 Field Regiment
 77 Field Regiment
 78 Field Regiment
 79 Medium Regiment
 80 Medium Regiment
 81 Field Regiment
 90 Field Regiment
 91 Field Regiment (Asal Uttar)
 92 Field Regiment
 93 Field Regiment
 94 Field Regiment
 95 Field Regiment
 96 Medium Regiment
 97 Field Regiment
 98 Field Regiment
 99 Field Regiment (Sylhet)
 100 Field Regiment
 101 Field Regiment (Harar Kalan)
 102 Field Regiment
 106 Medium Regiment
 108 Field Regiment (Kargil)
 110 Medium Regiment
 111 Rocket Regiment
 113 Field Regiment
 114 Medium Regiment
 116 Medium Regiment
 118 Medium Regiment
 121 Light Regiment
 133 Medium Regiment
 136 Field Regiment
 137 Field Regiment
 138 Medium Regiment
 139 Medium Regiment (Kargil)
 141 Medium Regiment (Kargil)
 143 Medium Regiment
 150 Field Regiment
 153 Medium Regiment (Self Propelled)
 154 Field Regiment
 155 Field Regiment (Self Propelled)
 158 Medium Regiment (Self Propelled) (Kargil)
 159 Field Regiment
 161 Medium Regiment (Basantar River)
 162 Medium Regiment
 163 Medium Regiment
 164 Medium Regiment (Parbat Ali)
 165 Field Regiment
 166 Medium Regiment
 167 Medium Regiment
 168 Field Regiment (Longewala)
 169 Medium Regiment (OP Hill)
 170 Medium Regiment
 171 Medium Regiment
 172 Medium Regiment
 173 Medium Regiment
 174 Medium Regiment (Sehjra)
 175 Medium Regiment
 176 Medium Regiment
 177 Field Regiment
 189 Field Regiment
 190 Medium Regiment
 191 Field Regiment
 192 Field Regiment
 193 Medium Regiment
 194 Medium Regiment
 195 Medium Regiment (Banwat)
 196 Medium Regiment
 197 Medium Regiment (Kargil)
 198 Field Regiment
 199 Medium Regiment
 200 Field Regiment
 207 Medium Regiment
 210 Rocket Regiment
 212 Rocket Regiment (Kargil)
 213 Rocket Regiment
 214 Rocket Regiment
 216 Medium Regiment
 217 Field Regiment
 218 Medium Regiment
 219 Medium Regiment
 220 Field Regiment
 221 Field Regiment
 222 Field Regiment
 223 Field Regiment
 224 Medium Regiment (Self Propelled)
 225 Field Regiment
 226 Field Regiment
 228 Field Regiment
 230 Medium Regiment
 237 Medium Regiment
 242 Medium Regiment
 244 Field Regiment
 246 Field Regiment
 253 Medium Regiment
 255 Medium Regiment
 262 Field Regiment
 268 Field Regiment
 269 Medium Regiment (Self Propelled)
 274 Field Regiment
 278 Field Regiment
 281 Field Regiment
 282 Medium Regiment
 283 Field Regiment
 284 Field Regiment
 285 Medium Regiment
 286 Field Regiment (Kargil)
 287 Field Regiment
 288 Medium Regiment
 290 Medium Regiment
 297 Medium Regiment
 298 Field Regiment (Kargil)
 299 Medium Regiment
 301 Light Regiment
 302 Medium Regiment
 305 Field Regiment (Kargil)
 306 Field Regiment
 307 Medium Regiment
 310 Field Regiment
 311 Field Regiment
 312 Medium Regiment
 313 Field Regiment
 314 Heavy Mortar Regiment
 315 Field Regiment (Kargil)
 316 Field Regiment
 317 Field Regiment
 318 Medium Regiment
 320 Medium Regiment
 321 Field Regiment
 322 Field Regiment
 323 Field Regiment
 324 Field Regiment
 325 Field Regiment
 326 Field Regiment
 327 Medium Regiment
 328 Medium Regiment
 329 Medium Regiment
 330 Field Regiment
 331 Medium Regiment
 332 Field Regiment
 333 Missile Group
 334 Missile Group
 335 Missile Group
 336 Field Regiment
 337 Field Regiment
 338 Medium Regiment
 339 Medium Regiment
 340 Medium Regiment
 341 Medium Regiment
 343 Field Regiment
 344 Missile Regiment
 346 Field Regiment
 354 Missile Regiment
 371 Missile Regiment
 501 Light Regiment
 551 Rocket Regiment
 581 Light Regiment
 821 Light Regiment
 831 Light Regiment
 832 Light Regiment
 841 Rocket Regiment
 851 Light Regiment
 852 Light Regiment
 861 Missile Regiment (Laleali & Picquet 707)
 862 Missile Regiment
 863 Missile Regiment
 864 Missile Regiment 
 871 Field Regiment (Shingo)
 872 Light Regiment
 881 Missile Regiment
 891 Field Regiment
 1811 Medium Regiment 
 1812 Rocket Regiment
 1821 Light Regiment
 1822 Light Regiment
 1831 Light Regiment
 1832 Light Regiment
 1841 Light Regiment
 1842 Light Regiment
 1851 Light Regiment
 1861 Light Regiment
 1862 Light Regiment
 1871 Field Regiment
 1872 Rocket Regiment
 1880 Rocket Regiment
 1881 Light Regiment
 1889 Missile Regiment (Kargil)
 1890 Rocket Regiment
 1900 Medium Regiment
 1905 Light Regiment
 1906 Light Regiment
 1907 Light Regiment
 1908 Light Regiment
 3342 Missile Regiment
 1988 (Independent) Medium Battery

SATA units

Units of the Regiment of Artillery that have equipment other than weapons are listed below. These units mainly have Surveillance and Target Acquisition (SATA) equipment, Surveillance and target acquisition is a military role assigned to units and/or their equipment. It involves watching an area to see what changes (surveillance) for the purpose of enemy field artillery acquisition , then the acquisition of targets based on that information, and example of their equipment include Counter-battery radar (CoBRa) and Unmanned aerial vehicles (UAVs) (see also
Mobile Artillery Monitoring Battlefield Asset (MAMBA)).

 20 SATA Regiment
 21 SATA Regiment
 122 SATA Regiment
 124 SATA Battery
 125 SATA Regiment
 126 SATA Battery
 127 SATA Regiment
 128 SATA Regiment
 129 SATA Regiment
 131 SATA Regiment
 132 SATA Regiment
 201 SATA Battery
 202 SATA Battery
 203 SATA Regiment
 204 SATA Battery
 205 SATA Battery
 206 SATA Battery
 229 SATA Battery
 267 SATA Battery
 279 SATA Battery
 289 SATA Battery
 617 SATA Battery
 618 SATA Battery
 619 SATA Battery
 620 SATA Battery
 621 SATA Battery
 622 SATA Battery
 623 SATA Battery
 624 SATA Battery
 625 SATA Battery
 626 SATA Battery
 627 SATA Battery
 628 SATA Battery
 629 SATA Battery
 630 SATA Battery
 631 SATA Battery
 632 SATA Battery
 633 SATA Battery
 634 SATA Battery
 635 SATA Battery
 636 SATA Battery
 637 SATA Battery
 638 SATA Battery
 641 SATA Battery

Infantry

Mechanised

Corps of Army Air Defence

The list of army air defence regiments is as follows:

 19 AD Regiment
 25 AD Regiment
 26 AD Regiment
 27 AD Missile Regiment (Amritsar Airfield)
 28 AD Regiment
 29 AD Regiment (Samba)
 45 AD Regiment (Basantar River)
 46 AD Regiment
 47 AD Regiment
 48 AD Regiment
 49 AD Regiment
 50 Light AD Regiment (Composite)
 103 AD Regiment
 104 AD Regiment
 105 AD Regiment
 107 AD Regiment
 109 Light AD Regiment (Self Propelled)
 126 Light AD Regiment (Composite)
 127 Light AD Regiment (Composite)
 128 AD Missile Regiment
 129 AD Regiment 
 130 AD Regiment
 131 AD Regiment
 140 AD Regiment
 142 AD Regiment (Self Propelled)
 144 AD Regiment (Self Propelled)
 145 Light AD Regiment (Self Propelled)
 146 Light AD Regiment (Self Propelled)
 147 Light AD Regiment (Composite)
 148 Light AD Regiment
 151 AD Regiment (Self Propelled) (Chhamb)
 152 AD Regiment
 156 Light AD Missile Regiment (Self propelled)
 157 Light AD Regiment (Composite)
 322 AD Regiment
 323 AD Regiment
 325 Light AD Regiment (Composite)
 326 Light AD Regiment
 401 Light AD Regiment (Composite)
 402 Light AD Regiment
 403 Light AD Regiment (Composite)
 404 Light AD Regiment (Composite)
 405 Light AD Regiment (Self Propelled)
 407 Gun Missile AD Regiment
 436 AD Missile Regiment (Self Propelled)
 501 AD Group (Self Propelled)
 502 AD Group (Self Propelled)
 510 Light AD Missile Regiment (Self Propelled)
 511 AD Missile Regiment (Self Propelled) (Composite)
 512 Light AD Missile Regiment (Self Propelled)
 513 AD Missile Regiment (Self Propelled)
 514 AD Regiment (Self Propelled)
 912 Light AD Regiment
 916 Light AD Regiment (Composite)
 947 Light AD Regiment
 252 (Parachute) AD Battery

Corps of Engineers 

These were formed from the Sapper and Miner Groups of each of the erstwhile presidencies of British India. They are listed below in order of precedence:
 Madras Sappers
 Bengal Sappers
 Bombay Sappers

Army Aviation Corps

The Army Aviation Corps units are designated as 'Squadrons'. Each squadron generally consists of two Reconnaissance (Recce) and Observation Flights. R & O Flights might be part of squadrons or operate independently and do not have a parent squadron (designated by an (I) in their name). The suffix 'UH' stands for Utility Helicopter Flights and 'ALH-WSI' stands for Advanced Light Helicopter - Weapon Systems Integrated.
Squadrons

201 Army Aviation Squadron (UH)
202 Army Aviation Squadron (UH)
203 Army Aviation Squadron (UH)
204 Army Aviation Squadron (UH)
205 Army Aviation Squadron (UH)
206 Army Aviation Squadron (UH)
207 Army Aviation Squadron (UH)
251 Army Aviation Squadron (ALH-WSI)
252 Army Aviation Squadron (ALH-WSI)
254 Army Aviation Squadron (ALH-WSI)
257 Army Aviation Squadron (ALH-WSI)
301 Army Aviation Squadron (Spec Ops)
659 Army Aviation Squadron
660 Army Aviation Squadron
661 Army Aviation Squadron
663 Army Aviation Squadron
664 Army Aviation Squadron
662 Army Aviation Squadron
665 Army Aviation Squadron
666 Army Aviation Squadron
667 Army Aviation Squadron
668 Army Aviation Squadron
669 Army Aviation Squadron
670 Army Aviation Squadron

Flights

1 (I) R&O Flight
2 R&O Flight
3 R&O Flight
4 R&O Flight
5 R&O Flight
6 R&O Flight
7 R&O Flight
8 R&O Flight
9 R&O Flight
10 R&O Flight
11 R&O Flight
12 (I) R&O Flight
13 R&O Flight
14 R&O Flight
15 R&O Flight
16 R&O Flight
17 R&O Flight
18 R&O Flight
19 R&O Flight
20 R&O Flight
21 R&O Flight
22 (I) R&O Flight
23 (I) R&O Flight
24 R&O Flight
25 R&O Flight
26 R&O Flight
27 (I) R&O Flight
28 R&O Flight
29 R&O Flight
30 (I) R&O Flight
31 R&O Flight
32 R&O Flight
33 R&O Flight
34 R&O Flight
35 R&O Flight
58 RPA Flight
37 (I) R&O Flight
38 (I) R&O Flight
39 (I) R&O Flight
40 (I) R&O Flight
1 (I) UH Flight
2 (I) UH Flight
2011 UH Flight
2012 UH Flight
2021 UH Flight
2022 UH Flight
2031 UH Flight
2032 UH Flight
2041 UH Flight
2042 UH Flight
2051 UH Flight
2052 UH Flight
2061 UH Flight
2062 UH Flight
2071 UH Flight
2072 UH Flight
2511 ALH-WSI Flight
2512 ALH-WSI Flight
2521 ALH-WSI Flight
2522 ALH-WSI Flight
2571 ALH-WSI Flight
2572 ALH-WSI Flight

Corps of Signals

See also
 Military of India
 Paramilitary forces of India
 Women in Indian Armed Forces

References

External links 
 Mahar regiment

 
Regiments
Regiments